Mame-Marie Sy-Diop (born 25 March 1985) is a Senegalese basketball player. In 2009 she was a member of the Senegal team when they won the FIBA Africa Championship for Women that year.She was a member of the Senegal women's national basketball team at the 2016 Summer Olympics.

References

External links

1985 births
Living people
Senegalese women's basketball players
Olympic basketball players of Senegal
Basketball players at the 2016 Summer Olympics
Senegalese expatriate basketball people in France
African Games gold medalists for Senegal
African Games medalists in basketball
Centers (basketball)
Power forwards (basketball)
Basketball players from Dakar
Competitors at the 2011 All-Africa Games